The 2011–12 Cornwall Hockey Association Cup was the 2011-12 season of the Cornwall Hockey Association Knockout Cup, known as the Cornwall Cup or CHA Cup.  The CHA Cup is the flagship competition organised by the Cornwall Hockey Association, contested by senior male and female hockey teams in the county of Cornwall.

A total of 34 teams representing 13 clubs will compete in the competition (a reduction of 1 compared to the 2010-11 competition), and will begin on Sunday 25 September 2011 with the Ladies Cup, Preliminary round. The competition culminated with the Ladies Cup final on Sunday 15 April 2012 at Penzance HC. Truro HC and Newquay HC were the respective winners of the Men's and Ladies Cups.

Format 
Both the Men's Cup and Ladies Cup were contested as knockout competitions, with a single defeat eliminating the losing team. Teams which were defeated in, or prior to, Round 1 of the Cup competition qualified for the 2011–12 Cornwall Hockey Association Plate.

The 2011–12 season saw the draws for all rounds of the competitions made prior to the start of the tournament, thereby allowing teams to analyse their potential opponents in any subsequent rounds.  This system was previously used in the 2009–10 season, but dropped for the  2010–11 competition in favour of a system of drawing each round following the completion of the previous one.  As the trial proved unsuccessful, the system reverted for 2011–12.

Teams and calendar

Men's Cup

Of the 18 teams eligible for the Men's Cup, 15 entered the competition, representing eight clubs.

Fourteen of the fifteen competing clubs were entered into Round 1 of the competition, with the defending champions, Truro, being awarded a bye to the quarter finals.

Ladies Cup

Of the 19 teams eligible for the Ladies Cup, all 19 entered the competition representing thirteen clubs.
 

Of the nineteen competing teams, six were entered into a Preliminary round with the three winners joining the remaining thirteen  teams in Round 1.  The six teams contesting the preliminary round were those teams ranked lowest based upon their finishing position in the 2010-11 league season.

Results and Fixtures
The draw for both the Men's Cup and Ladies' Cup was carried out on 6 June 2011.

Men's Cup

Caradon were awarded a bye after their opposition club, St. Austell, folded in September 2011.

Ladies Cup

Preliminary round
The six lowest ranked teams in the competition (based upon their finishing position in the 2010-11 league season) will contest the preliminary round. The draw was carried out at random.  Rankings are shown in parentheses.

Main Draw

References

External links 
 http://www.cornwallhockey.org/default.aspx?id=4

Cornwall Hockey Association Knockout Cup
2010s in Cornwall
2012 in English sport